Didymoglossum petersii, the dwarf bristle fern, is a species in the family Hymenophyllaceae, (filmy ferns). It is one of three filmy ferns native to a significant area of the United States. It is found only in the nine most southeastern states, south of the Kentucky/Virginia - Tennessee/North Carolina dividing line, as well as in Mexico and Guatemala.

The genus Didymoglossum is accepted in the Pteridophyte Phylogeny Group classification of 2016 (PPG I), but not by some other sources. , Plants of the World Online merged the genus into a broadly defined Trichomanes, treating this species as Trichomanes petersii.

References

Hymenophyllales